Park Joo-bong (Hangul: 박주봉; Hanja: 朴柱奉; born 5 December 1964) is a former badminton player from South Korea who excelled from the early 1980s through the mid-1990s.

Career 
Park is one of the most successful players ever in the World Badminton Championships with 5 titles, 2 of them in men's doubles and 3 in mixed doubles. He also won a gold and a silver medal at the Summer Olympics and 9 All England Open Badminton Championships titles. Though Park was primarily a doubles player, the greatest one ever in the opinion of some, he was capable of world class level singles which he displayed in occasional tournaments and Thomas Cup appearances early in his career and currently holds the South Korean national record of 103 consecutive wins in men's singles from 1981 to 1984. His playing strengths included remarkable reflexes, reach, quickness, agility, and power.

Park competed for Korea in badminton at the 1992 Summer Olympics in men's doubles with partner Kim Moon-Soo. They won the gold medal defeating Eddy Hartono and Rudy Gunawan from Indonesia 15-11, 15-7. Park also competed for Korea in badminton at the 1996 Summer Olympics in mixed doubles with partner Ra Kyung-min. They won the silver medal, losing in the final against Kim Dong-moon and Gil Young-ah 13-15, 15-4, 15-12.

Park was inducted into the Badminton Hall of Fame in 2001.

Achievements

Olympic Games 
Men's doubles

Mixed doubles

World Championships 
Men's doubles

Mixed doubles

World Cup 
Men's doubles

Mixed doubles

Asian Games 
Men's doubles

Mixed doubles

Asian Championships 
Men's singles

Men's doubles

Mixed doubles

Asian Cup 
Mixed doubles

IBF World Grand Prix (47 titles, 9 runners-up)
The World Badminton Grand Prix sanctioned by International Badminton Federation (IBF) from 1983 to 2006.

Men's singles

Men's doubles

Mixed doubles

IBF International 
Men's doubles

Mixed doubles

Open Tournament 
Men's doubles

Invitational tournament 
Men's doubles

References

External links 
 
 

1964 births
Living people
South Korean male badminton players
People from Imsil County
Badminton players at the 1988 Summer Olympics
Badminton players at the 1992 Summer Olympics
Badminton players at the 1996 Summer Olympics
Olympic badminton players of South Korea
Olympic gold medalists for South Korea
Olympic silver medalists for South Korea
Olympic medalists in badminton
Medalists at the 1992 Summer Olympics
Medalists at the 1996 Summer Olympics
Badminton players at the 1982 Asian Games
Badminton players at the 1986 Asian Games
Badminton players at the 1990 Asian Games
Asian Games gold medalists for South Korea
Asian Games silver medalists for South Korea
Asian Games bronze medalists for South Korea
Asian Games medalists in badminton
Medalists at the 1982 Asian Games
Medalists at the 1986 Asian Games
Medalists at the 1990 Asian Games
World No. 1 badminton players
Badminton coaches
Sportspeople from North Jeolla Province